Glyphodes chrysialis is a moth in the family Crambidae. It was described by Stoll in 1790. It is found in the Democratic Republic of Congo (Equateur, West Kasai, Orientale), Gabon, Nigeria and South Africa.

References

Moths described in 1790
Glyphodes